{{DISPLAYTITLE:C10H10O}}
The molecular formula C10H10O (molar mass: 146.19 g/mol, exact mass: 146.0732 u) may refer to:

 Benzylideneacetone 
 Tetralones
 1-Tetralone
 2-Tetralone